Imouzzer Kandar is a town in Sefrou Province, Fès-Meknès, Morocco. According to the 2004 census it has a population of 13,745.  It is inhabited by the Ait Seghrouchen.

References

Populated places in Sefrou Province